John Palmer (28 January 1785, Bishop Middleham, County Durham – 23 August 1846, Chorlton-on-Medlock, Manchester) was an English architect who practised in Manchester. He was buried in the graveyard of St. Augustine's Chapel, which he had designed.

Some works

 Manchester Cathedral alterations (1814-1815)
 Pleasington Priory, Lancashire (1816–19)
 St Peter's Chapel, Blackburn (1819–22)
 St Augustine's Chapel, Manchester (1820)
 Blackburn Cathedral (1820-1826)
St Anne's Church, Turton, Lancashire (1840–41)

References

 H.M. Colvin, A Biographical Dictionary of British Architects, 1600-1840 (1997) 
 Nikolaus Pevsner North Lancashire (1969) 

1785 births
1846 deaths
19th-century English architects
Architects from County Durham
People from Bishop Middleham